Naworth Castle, also known or recorded in historical documents as "Naward", is a castle in Cumbria, England, near the town of Brampton. It is on the opposite side of the River Irthing to, and just within sight of, Lanercost Priory. It was the seat of the Barons Dacre and is now that of their cognatic descendants, the Earls of Carlisle. It is a Grade I listed building.

History
The castle is thought to have late 13th-century origins, in the form of a square keep and bailey. It was first mentioned in 1323, and in 1335, a licence to crenellate was granted to Ralph Dacre. 

Thomas Dacre (1467–1525), who commanded the reserve of the English army at the Battle of Flodden and was known as "the Builder Dacre", built the castle's gateway and placed over it his coat of arms with the Dacre family motto below: Fort en Loialte (Norman-French: "Strong in Loyalty").

It is likely that the 18th-century walled garden lies within the boundaries of the original moat. In June 1568, when Mary, Queen of Scots was at Carlisle Castle, it was mentioned that "Naward Castle is moated about, and much stronger for her detention". Although Naworth was "strong, and fit" for Mary, there was no store of wine and beer at the castle.

Further additions were made in 1602 for Lord William Howard. He purchased back the Dacre family estate from King James and took up residence with his children and grandchildren at Naworth Castle.  He restored the castle, improved the estate and established order in that part of the country. He had a large family of children, of whom Philip, his heir, was the grandfather of Charles Howard, 1st Earl of Carlisle, and his younger son Francis was the ancestor of the Howards of Corby.

William Morris, the artist and socialist, stayed at the castle in August 1874. In a letter to Aglaia Coronio, he writes "...all is very pleasant. Ned & I pass our mornings in a most delightful room in one of the towers that has not been touched since William Howard of Queen Elizabeth's time lived there: the whole place is certainly the most poetical in England."

From 1939 to 1940, Naworth was occupied by Rossall School from Fleetwood in Lancashire, which had been evacuated from its own buildings by various government departments.

It is currently occupied by the Hon. Philip Howard, younger brother and heir presumptive of the 13th Earl of Carlisle.

1844 fire
On Saturday, 18 May 1844, the castle caught fire, possibly as a result of the ignition of some soot in the flue of the Porter's Lodge. The structure's lack of internal walls allowed the fire to spread rapidly, and it remained unchecked until it reached the northern wing. Although some property was saved, by the time two fire engines had arrived by train from Carlisle, most of the roof had collapsed and the fire had spread to nearly every room on the three sides of the quadrangle. Water had to be passed in buckets from a rivulet at the foot of a steep hill on the north side of the castle. "Belted Will's Tower" was saved, while the fire continued until around one o'clock on Sunday morning, when it was brought under control. Subsequent restoration was undertaken by the architect Anthony Salvin.

Miscellanea
The castle has a well-preserved priest hole.
 Francis Galton is said to have invented the concept of correlation at Naworth Castle.
 Sir Walter Scott described the castle as: "one of those extensive baronial seats which marked the splendour of our ancient nobles, before they exchanged the hospitable magnificence of a life spent among a numerous tenantry, for the uncertain honours of court attendance, and the equivocal rewards of ministerial favour."

See also

Grade I listed buildings in Cumbria
Listed buildings in Brampton, Carlisle
Castles in Great Britain and Ireland
List of castles in England

References

External links

Naworth Castle
Priest Hole and historical notes
Historic Houses In Cumbria – Naworth Castle
Images of Naworth Castle

Country houses in Cumbria
Castles in Cumbria
Grade I listed buildings in Cumbria
+
Grade I listed castles
Brampton, Carlisle